Toronto Awaba Football Club are an Australian semi-professional soccer club based in Toronto, Newcastle, Australia. The club are currently playing in the fourth tier of Australian soccer, the Northern New South Wales NewFM Football League. The team was relegated from the NBN State Football League at the end of the 2010 season.

History
Originally formed in 1922 by the then Awaba Cricket Club, the football team was playing on a small ground of literally dug out bush. In these times there was no change-room facilities and only local social clubs would come to play such as Barnsley and Teralba. It was now a decision was made to find a new suitable ground for the club. After this move Toronto Awaba was invited into the competition football season, in which it gained a total of 3 points in its first two seasons. However the following season in 1947 the club ran out premiers by a big margin. Although it was not until 1957 in which they were promoted to the State First Division for the first time. There the Stags have stayed tasting some success throughout their time in the State Football League.

Club colours
2015 sees The Stags return to a Yellow and Blue vertical striped Home Jersey, the jersey is seen to be a link to the past and is heavily liked by the current playing group. The Away Jersey is White jersey with a Blue and Yellow slash coming from the left shoulder, this jersey designed by the players is a sharp addition to The Stags attire. The Goal Keepers will play in a Grey Jersey with Blue and Yellow horizontal stripes across the chest. The club will wear Blue shorts for both Home and Away games, with Yellow socks for Home games and Blue socks with the Away Kit.

Home ground
Toronto Awaba play out of the historic Lyall Peacock Field, it is located at the corner of Cook and Thorn streets, Toronto. Lyall Peacock Field is easily recognisable for its famous grandstand on the half way line of the field.

Recent Seasons

2006 to 2008
The 2006, 2007 and 2008 seasons were similar,  with no grades qualifying for the finals series.
 In 2006, the Senior Team finished the season in 10th position with a total of 13 points.
 In 2007, the Senior Team finished the season in 8th position with a total of 17 points.
 In 2008, the Senior Team finished the season in 9th position with a total of 15 points.

2009
The 2009 competition had a changed format with the total number of teams reduced to eight. Toronto Awaba was offered a place in this format and is confirmed until the 2011 season.

2010
The 2010 season was one of the busiest of recent history. The year started with a complete overhaul of the committee. With the new committee came a new coach. Originally chosen as Under-23s coach, Lindsay Tapp was promoted to senior coach with Mike Trebilcock, who had had years of experience as Assistant coach at Highfields Azzuri and Coach of the Edgeworth Eagles Youth Grade. Lindsay attracted mainly young players, most notably Josh Small. Tapp also brought senior players to the club, most notably Christian Okonkwo, Jason Cowburn, Sean Matthews and Scott Baillie. The team only managed 1 point whilst under Tapp's charge. Tapp was let go and Scott Baillie, former National League player and formerly player/coach of West Sydney Berries, was given charge for the rest of the season and the following season. The Stags finished last on the table, and as relegation had been reintroduced to the format of the competition they were dropped to the NEWFM First Division for 2011.

2011
The 2011 season was Toronto's first endeavour into the NEW FM state league in the previous five years. A complete overhaul of the playing and coaching staff enabled a fresh approach to the start of a new season, which included the signing of former Newcastle United and Newcastle Jet Stephen Eagleton as the under 23's coach and squad member of first grade. Only one player remained on the club's books from the 2010 season. Bailie's preferred 3–5–2 system was used by all three grades (U19's, 23's and First Grade). The senior team was able to qualify for the finals series (for the first time in five years) after having finished fourth in the regular standings. They lost 9–1 on aggregate to Charleston.

2012
The 2012 season was a season with many ups and downs for the Toronto Awaba Stags. TheSenior team finished the season in 4th position with a total of 35 points, and played in the finals serious for the second consecutive year.

2015 to 2016
These two seasons were tough for the Stags both on and off the field with a vast rebuilding effort having been undertaken. The Stags while didn't achieve high results, the youth culture that has been built at the club is admirable. 2016 was the last year with Tony Jovcevski as the Senior team's coach.

Rivalries
The Stags have several strong rivals across the greater Lake Macquarie region with clubs such as Lake Macquarie City Roosters FC, Westlakes Wildcats FC and Morisset Strikers FC.

External links
Toronto Awaba FC (Toronto Awaba Junior Soccer Football Club
NBN League Website
Northern NSW Football Federation Main Site
OzFootball.net

1922 establishments in Australia
Association football clubs established in 1922
Soccer clubs in Newcastle, New South Wales